Acidovorax konjaci is a Gram-negative bacterium. It can cause a plant disease, the leaf blight of Amorphophallus rivieri, a food crop of Japan.

References

External links
Type strain of Acidovorax konjaci at BacDive -  the Bacterial Diversity Metadatabase

Comamonadaceae
Bacteria described in 1992